AAFH may refer to:

 Addis Ababa Fistula Hospital, hospital, Africa
 "Army and Air Force Family Housing", see U.S. Army Corps of Engineers, Europe District#* Army and Air Force Family Housing (AFH/AAFH) –